Douglas Samuel Asad (born August 27, 1938) is a former American football tight end in the American Football League. He played college football at Northwestern University, and played professionally for the Oakland Raiders in 1960 and 1961.

Asad played high school football at Fairview High School in Fairview Park, Ohio.

See also
List of American Football League players

1938 births
Living people
People from Fairview Park, Ohio
Players of American football from Ohio
American football tight ends
Northwestern Wildcats football players
Oakland Raiders players
Sportspeople from Cuyahoga County, Ohio
American Football League players